Pere Riba and Santiago Ventura chose not to defend their 2009 title.
Juan Sebastián Cabal and Robert Farah won the final against Pablo Galdón and Andrés Molteni 6–1, 6–2.

Seeds

Draw

Draw
{{16TeamBracket-Compact-Tennis3
| RD1=First round
| RD2=Quarterfinals
| RD3=Semifinals
| RD4=Final

| RD1-seed01=1
| RD1-team01= L Tavares
| RD1-score01-1=6
| RD1-score01-2=6
| RD1-score01-3= 
| RD1-seed02= 
| RD1-team02= JC Campozano G Lapentti
| RD1-score02-1=4
| RD1-score02-2=1
| RD1-score02-3= 

| RD1-seed03= 
| RD1-team03= P Galdón A Molteni
| RD1-score03-1=6
| RD1-score03-2=3
| RD1-score03-3=[10]
| RD1-seed04=WC
| RD1-team04= JS Gómez E Struvay
| RD1-score04-1=3
| RD1-score04-2=6
| RD1-score04-3=[5]

| RD1-seed05=3
| RD1-team05= J Aguilar D Garza
| RD1-score05-1= 
| RD1-score05-2= 
| RD1-score05-3= 
| RD1-seed06= 
| RD1-team06= JP Brzezicki C Zampieri
| RD1-score06-1= 
| RD1-score06-2= 
| RD1-score06-3= 

| RD1-seed07= 
| RD1-team07= R Hocevar F Romboli
| RD1-score07-1=4
| RD1-score07-2=4
| RD1-score07-3= 
| RD1-seed08= 
| RD1-team08=
| RD1-score08-1=6
| RD1-score08-2=6
| RD1-score08-3= 

| RD1-seed09= 
| RD1-team09= R El Amrani M Jaziri
| RD1-score09-1=5
| RD1-score09-2=6
| RD1-score09-3= 
| RD1-seed10= 
| RD1-team10= S Decoud C Salamanca
| RD1-score10-1=7
| RD1-score10-2=2
| RD1-score10-3=r

| RD1-seed11= 
| RD1-team11= A Falla A González
| RD1-score11-1=5
| RD1-score11-2=2
| RD1-score11-3= 
| RD1-seed12=4
| RD1-team12= F del Bonis D Junqueira
| RD1-score12-1=7
| RD1-score12-2=6
| RD1-score12-3= 

| RD1-seed13=WC
| RD1-team13= Sebastián López Sebastián Serrano
| RD1-score13-1=7
| RD1-score13-2=2
| RD1-score13-3=[7]
| RD1-seed14=WC
| RD1-team14= G Elias V Estrella
| RD1-score14-1=65
| RD1-score14-2=6
| RD1-score14-3=[10]

| RD1-seed15= 
| RD1-team15= I Navarro A Ramos-Viñolas
| RD1-score15-1=3
| RD1-score15-2=0
| RD1-score15-3= 
| RD1-seed16=2
| RD1-team16= JS Cabal R Farah
| RD1-score16-1=6
| RD1-score16-2=6
| RD1-score16-3= 

| RD2-seed01=1
| RD2-team01= L Tavares
| RD2-score01-1=w/o
| RD2-score01-2= 
| RD2-score01-3= 
| RD2-seed02= 
| RD2-team02= P Galdón A Molteni
| RD2-score02-1= 
| RD2-score02-2= 
| RD2-score02-3= 

| RD2-seed03=3
| RD2-team03= J Aguilar D Garza
| RD2-score03-1=1
| RD2-score03-2=6
| RD2-score03-3=[3]
| RD2-seed04= 
| RD2-team04=

References
 Doubles Draw

Seguros Bolivar Open Bucaramanga - Doubles
2010 Doubles